Fedra is an opera (melodramma serio) in two acts composed by Simon Mayr to an Italian-language libretto by Luigi Romanelli based on Racine's play Phèdre.

It premiered on 26 December 1820 at La Scala in Milan with Teresa Belloc-Giorgi in the title role. The German premiere of the opera took place at the Staatstheater Braunschweig on 30 March 2008, 188 years after its first performance.

Recordings

References

External links
 Complete libretto (published in Milan 1821; digitised by the Bavarian State Library)
 Work details, Corago, University of Bologna

Operas by Simon Mayr
Italian-language operas
1820 operas
Operas
Operas based on works by Jean Racine
Phaedra
Works based on Phèdre